James Maxwell Miller (born 20 September 1937) is an American Old Testament scholar. He was born in Kosciusko, Mississippi and studied at Millsaps College (BA, 1958) and Emory University (PhD, 1964). He is Professor Emeritus of Old Testament at the Candler School of Theology, Emory University.

In 2002, a Festschrift was published in his honor. The Land that I Will Show You: Essays on the History and Archaeology of the Ancient Near East in Honor of J. Maxwell Miller included contributions from Philip R. Davies, Jack M. Sasson, and John Van Seters.

References

1937 births
Living people
People from Kosciusko, Mississippi
American biblical scholars
Old Testament scholars
Millsaps College alumni
Candler School of Theology faculty
Candler School of Theology alumni